Kark or Karak may refer to:

 Kark, Iran (disambiguation)
 Kark (Hindu astrology), a Hindu zodiac sign

People with the surname
 Austen Kark (1926–2002), British broadcaster
 Feliks Kark (born 1933), Estonian actor and caricaturist
 Friedrich Kark (1869–1939), German conductor
 Jeremy David Kark (1943–2018), South African-Israeli epidemiologist
 Karl Kark (1884–1924), Estonian engineer and politician
 Ruth Kark (born 1941), Israeli geographer
 Tõnu Kark (born 1947), Estonian actor

See also
 KARK-TV, an American television station

Estonian-language surnames